The Irish cricket team toured the West Indies in January and February 2014 to play two Twenty20 Internationals (T20Is) and a One Day International (ODI) match. Along with the international matches, Ireland also competed in the 2013–14 Regional Super50 tournament. The T20I series was drawn 1–1 and the West Indies won the only ODI.

T20I series

1st T20I

2nd T20I

ODI series

Only ODI

References

External links
 Series home at ESPN Cricinfo

2014 in Irish cricket
2014 in West Indian cricket
International cricket competitions in 2013–14
Irish cricket tours of the West Indies